Le Domaine-du-Roy (The King's Domain) is a regional county municipality in the Saguenay-Lac-Saint-Jean region of Quebec, Canada. Its seat is in Roberval, and it is named for the King of France, who owned the land at the time of the colonization of Quebec.

Subdivisions
There are 10 subdivisions within the RCM:

Cities & Towns (2)
 Roberval
 Saint-Félicien

Municipalities (5)
 Chambord
 Lac-Bouchette
 Sainte-Hedwidge
 Saint-François-de-Sales
 Saint-Prime

Parishes (1)
 La Doré

Villages (1)
 Saint-André-du-Lac-Saint-Jean

Unorganized Territory (1)
 Lac-Ashuapmushuan

Indian Reserve (1)
 Mashteuiatsh

Demographics

Population

Language

Transportation

Access routes
Highways and numbered routes that run through the municipality, including external routes that start or finish at the county border:

Autoroutes
 None

Principal Highways
 
 
 

Secondary Highways
 None

External Routes
 None

See also
 List of regional county municipalities and equivalent territories in Quebec

References

 

 
Census divisions of Quebec